Santo Luigi Cilauro (born 25 November 1961) is an Australian comedian, television and feature film producer, screenwriter, actor, author and cameraman who is also a co-founder of The D-Generation. Known as the weatherman in Frontline, he is also an author and former radio presenter on the Triple M Network, and achieved worldwide fame with the viral video Elektronik Supersonik.

Early life
Cilauro was born in 1961 in Melbourne, Australia to parents of Italian descent.  Cilauro attended the University of Melbourne in the 1980s and graduated with a Bachelor of Arts and a Bachelor of Laws in 1987.

In 1984, while walking to his aunt's house in Melbourne, he stumbled across a Juventus press conference during their tour of Australia, and after seeing coach Giovanni Trapattoni struggle to answer questions in English, used his Italian skills to translate, which resulted in Cilauro becoming the team translator for the rest of the tour.

Acting and production work
Cilauro started collaborating with Rob Sitch and Tom Gleisner in comedy theatre productions and tours. He is one of the co-founders of The D-Generation.

Cilauro wrote for, and performed in, the troupe's show during its 1986–87 run on ABC TV (which also led to the album The Satanic Sketches). Cilauro continued as a member of the D-Gen when the team hosted their Breakfast Show on Triple M radio (1986–1992), appearing as the simple-minded "Wayne from St. Albans" and "Gino Tagliatoni" amongst other roles. Cilauro was a writer/performer on the D-Generation's 1992–1993 sketch comedy The Late Show, appearing on such segments as Graham & the Colonel, The Oz Brothers and Jeff & Terry Bailey.

After the second and last season of The Late Show, Cilauro starred as Stix in the 1994 ABC cop show satire Funky Squad, which he also co-created and served as one of the writer/producer/directors. He went on to help set up the Working Dog production company and was one of the writer/producer/directors of Frontline (1994–97), in which he also had a recurring onscreen role as weatherman Geoffrey Salter. Since then, Cilauro co-wrote Working Dog's popular films The Castle (1997) and The Dish (2000) and appeared as a regular member (and occasional host) of the 1998–2003 Network Ten programme The Panel.

Cilauro has been an executive producer of several Working Dog productions, including The Panel, A River Somewhere (1997–98), and All Aussie Adventures (2001–02). He played the Head of Market Research, Theo Tsolakis, on The Hollowmen (2008), a series which Cilauro co-wrote and co-produced. Cilauro also played IT technician Griffin on the Shaun Micallef sitcom Welcher & Welcher (2003) and K2 on the 1996 Working Dog radio sketch Johnny Swank.

During the 2010 FIFA World Cup, he hosted a nightly comedy/variety show called Santo, Sam and Ed's Cup Fever! live from Melbourne alongside Ed Kavalee and Sam Pang.
In 2014 Cilauro joined his Working Dog colleagues, Sitch and Gleisner to stage the group's first play, The Speechmaker.

Filmography

Films

Television

Zladko Vladcik
Cilauro, along with Rob Sitch and Tom Gleisner, created the popular Internet phenomenon character Zladko "ZLAD!" Vladcik, a Molvanian synth-pop musician. Zlad was performed by Cilauro to accompany the Jetlag Travel Guide to Molvanîa. Cilauro was, with Sitch and Gleisner, co-author of the Jetlag Travel Guides to Molvanîa, Phaic Tăn and San Sombrèro.

Two music videos were performed by Cilauro as Zladko, for "Elektronik – Supersonik" and "I Am The Anti-Pope".

References

External links
 
 molvania.com – Cilauro's parody site on the fictional country Molvanîa

1961 births
Living people
Australian film producers
Australian screenwriters
Australian people of Italian descent
Comedians from Melbourne
People educated at Xavier College
Australian male comedians
Australian television talk show hosts
Melbourne Law School alumni
Australian film studio executives
Australian podcasters
Radio personalities from Melbourne